"The Way You Move" is a hip-hop and soul song performed by Big Boi of American hip hop duo OutKast. The song features OutKast mentor Sleepy Brown on guest vocals. Along with "Hey Ya!", recorded by OutKast's other member André 3000, "The Way You Move" is one of the two lead singles from Speakerboxxx/The Love Below, OutKast's double album project that includes a solo album from each member.

Released from Big Boi's Speakerboxxx half of the double album by LaFace and Arista Records on August 25, 2003, "The Way You Move" peaked at number one on the US Billboard Hot 100 the following year, becoming OutKast's third number-one pop single, and the 900th for Billboard. In 2009, it was named the 22nd most successful song of the 2000s on the Billboard Hot 100 Songs of the Decade.

Song information
"The Way You Move" is credited to Big Boi, Sleepy Brown, and the song's producer, Carlton Mahone; Big Boi also does some co-production. Combining elements of bass music, Atlanta-style southern hip hop, and 1970s soul music, "The Way You Move" is Big Boi's light-hearted dedication to women. 

The song's instrumental track is punctuated with the prominent live horn section "Hornz Unlimited" of Atlanta reminiscent of Earth Wind and Fire, which features Sleepy Brown singing in style inspired by the work of Motown star Marvin Gaye.

Music video
The song's music video, directed by Bryan Barber, features Big Boi as the proprietor of a rim shop. The video's performance shots eventually gravitate to other locations during the video's running time, featuring several young women who Big Boi, dressed in a pimp's suit, attempts to pick up. 

The video features an appearance from Fonzworth Bentley and another from actress Ki Toy Johnson. "The Way You Move" music video was designed to be shown in tandem with the video for André 3000's "Hey Ya!". A long-form "The Way You Move/Hey Ya!" video combines both clips with a bridging sequence. The music video opens with Big Boi and Sleepy Brown pulling into a garage that specializes in automotive audio systems.

Chart performance
"The Way You Move" debuted at number 83 on the week ending September 27, 2003, four days after its release. It would later reach number two for eight consecutive weeks behind the group's other lead single "Hey Ya!". 

It finally replaced "Hey Ya!" at number one on February 14, 2004, where it stayed for one week, which was the sixth time a recording act has replaced itself on the Billboard pop chart. "The Way You Move" was ranked number five on the 2004 Billboard Year-End Chart. On the Hot R&B/Hip-Hop Singles & Tracks chart, "The Way You Move" peaked at number two (seven positions higher than "Hey Ya!"), and topped the Hot Rap Tracks chart.

Track listings
UK CD1
 "The Way You Move" (club mix) – 3:56
 "The Way You Move" (Johnny Toobad full length vocal) – 6:55
 "The Way You Move" (Full Phat radio mix) – 3:35
 "The Way You Move" (video)

UK CD2
 "The Way You Move" (clean album version) – 3:56
 "The Way You Move" (Johnny Toobad radio mix) – 3:52

Europe single
 "The Way You Move" (radio mix) – 3:55
 "The Way You Move" (Full Phatt radio mix) – 3:31

European and Australian maxi-single
 "The Way You Move" (radio mix) – 3:55
 "The Way You Move" (Full Phatt radio mix) - 3:31
 "The Way You Move" (Johnny Too Bad radio mix) – 3:52
 "The Way You Move" (Cutmaster Swift remix) – 4:22
 "The Way You Move" (video)

"The Way You Move" / "Hey Ya!" 12-inch vinyl single
A1. "The Way You Move" (radio mix) – 3:55
A2. "The Way You Move" (club mix) – 3:55
A3. "The Way You Move" (instrumental) – 3:55
B1. "Hey Ya!" (radio mix) – 4:09
B2. "Hey Ya!" (instrumental) – 4:09

Charts

Weekly charts

Year-end charts

All-time charts

Certifications

Release history

In popular culture
 The song was featured and poked fun at in an episode of Chappelle's Show, in a skit entitled "Making the Band", in which P. Diddy (played by Chappelle) is joined by his assistant, Fonzworth Bentley (played by Chappelle), who comes flying in using his umbrella as a parachute, just as Fonzworth does in "The Way You Move" music video.
 A heavily edited version of the song is featured in the console versions of Tiger Woods PGA Tour 2005, and is a playable song in Shark Tale.
 The "Full Phatt Radio Mix" is featured on Dance Dance Revolution Universe 2.
 A marching band performance of the song was included in the Super Bowl XXXVIII halftime show
 Big Boi performed the song in the Super Bowl LIII halftime show.

Kenny G and Earth, Wind & Fire cover

In 2004, saxophonist Kenny G and Earth, Wind & Fire issued a cover of "The Way You Move" as a single on Arista Records. The song reached No. 12 on both the Billboard Adult Contemporary Songs chart and Billboard Smooth Jazz Songs chart. "The Way You Move" also reached No. 25 on the Billboard Adult R&B Songs chart.

Overview
"The Way You Move" appeared on Kenny G's 2004 LP At Last...The Duets Album and Earth, Wind & Fire's 2005 album Illumination.

Critical reception
People called the tune a "polyrythmic party". Matt Collar of Allmusic declared that "Earth, Wind & Fire pull a "no brainer" on OutKast's "The Way You Move." 
David Wild of Rolling Stone also proclaimed The Way You Move "could go down as the funkiest song" in Kenny G's catalog.

Charts

See also
 List of Hot 100 number-one singles of 2004 (U.S.)

References

2003 songs
2003 singles
Outkast songs
Songs written by Big Boi
Earth, Wind & Fire songs
Kenny G songs
Arista Records singles
LaFace Records singles
RCA Records singles
Billboard Hot 100 number-one singles
Songs written by Sleepy Brown